Betty Moschhona (7 March 1927 in Patras – 6 December 2006 in Athens) was a Greek actress.

She received her first role in 1952 with Mimis Kokkinis' company and participated in inspected with different comical roles (Vlachos, Kritikos, Nevrikia, Gria, Methysmeni). She employed between others including the Kalouta sisters, Orestis Makris, Sofia Vebo, Rena Dor, Al. Livaditis, Kouli Stoligka and the husband of Takis Miliadis.  In 1966 and 1967, she became the company head of Rena Vlachopoulou and Vasilis Avlonitis in a repertoire always with the company in the comedy community.  In 1968 and 1969, she had an artistic member of the company Asoi tou geliou at the Vebo Theatre.

After 1970, Moschona acted with Lambros Konstantaras, Kostas Karras, Mary Chronopoulou, Nikos Rizos, Rena Vlachopoulou, Aliki Vougiouklaki (in Efthymi chira).  For some years, she remained at Kostas Voutsas's company.  The swan song ballad at the theater from 1998 until 1999 in the Hal Salguin comedy at the Apothiki Theater (Theatre).

She also played in films including Peripterou as well as television including Epta kaka tis moiras mou with Giorgos Konstantinou, in Axiotimos kyrious and in Madame Soussou.

She was awarded with the theatrical Ta Panathinaia for her roles at the theatre.

Filmography

Film

Television

Theater

External links

Biography at Helkin 
Biography at hellenica 

1927 births
2006 deaths
Greek actresses
Actors from Patras